Artsakh Public Radio and TV Company or Artsakh TV began broadcasting since 1 June 1988 in the Nagorno Karabakh Autonomous Region.

History 
Television in the Nagorno Karabakh Autonomous Region was established within the scope of foundation programs of local television companies in the former Soviet Union Autonomous republics and regions. The implementation of the program was delayed because of the policy carried out by Azerbaijan against the ethnic Armenian population of the region. The dream of the Artsakh nation to have television alongside of regional radio with a biography of about six decades came true in 1988. In 2003, with passing the law "On Television and Radio" Artsakh TV gained public status. 

The TV channel offers news, covering major national and international events as well as focusing on domestic issues, public, political, cultural, religious, sports, youth, children's and juvenile, as well as entertainment programs. Norek Gasparyan is currently Chairman of the Artsakh Public TV and Radio company's Board. The number of potential television audience is around 130,000.

References 

Republic of Artsakh culture